Komando Jihad (English: Jihad Commando) was an Indonesian Islamic extremist group that existed from the 1970s until it was dissolved through the actions of the security services in the mid-1980s. The group's foundation was an offshoot of Darul Islam, an extremist group fighting for an Indonesian Islamic state that began in the 1940s.

Damien Kingsbury has written allegation that the group was set up by Kopassus, the Indonesian Army special forces. In 2020, Tempo Data and Analysis Center, released their investigation report after collecting the sources from that time, confirming part of the story was true, although the formation was actually much like inadvertent.

History

Formation 
Komando Jihad was formed around 1970s. Based on the record, it already existed around 1975 under the name of Indonesian Islamic Revolutionary Board (Indonesian: Dewan Revolusi Islam Indonesia, DRII) an anti-Suharto underground Islamic resistance movement by Imran bin Muhammad Zein. In the letter to Ruhollah Khomeini supposed to be sent after Iranian Revolution, Imran congratulated him about the successful revolution, and claimed founding DRII with the assistance of some officers of the Indonesian Army. The goal of the group was founding Islamic State of Indonesia and toppling communism.

In another side, Admiral Sudomo, Commander of Kopkamtib revealed in aftermath of the hijack of the Garuda Indonesia Flight 206 to the ulamas that in early 1970s, the government actually fostered some Darul Islam veterans under government wing under Indonesian state intelligence agency at that time, Intelligence Coordinating Agency (Indonesian: Badan Koordinasi Intelijen, Bakin, predecessor of the current Indonesian State Intelligence Agency) for providing mass base for the ruling government to prepare the 1971 election. However, the plan apparently backfired, as some of the veterans later returned to jihadism and Islamic extremism and sided against Suharto. Formation of DRII and the later Komando Jihad, were unexpected and not anticipated by the government. Sudomo said that their transformation into DRII and Komando Jihad is beyond the Bakin's knowledge and claimed it was out-of-hands situation.

Hijack of Garuda Indonesia Flight 206

On 28 March 1981, five members of Komando Jihad boarded a Garuda Douglas DC-9 on a domestic flight from Palembang to Medan and took it and the 57 passengers aboard to Bangkok, Thailand. They were armed with machine guns and dynamite, and demanded the release of 20 political prisoners, that all "Jew officials and Israeli militarists" be expelled from Indonesia, and that they be given $1.5 million. After four days, Indonesian commandos stormed the plane, killing four out of the five hijackers; the fifth hijacker died from unknown causes while being transported to Jakarta. Apart from injuries to the pilot and a member of the flight crew, all other passengers and crew were unharmed.

References

Jihadist groups
Islamic terrorism in Indonesia
Organizations based in Asia designated as terrorist
Rebel groups in Indonesia